The 2013 Copa Claro was a men's tennis tournament played on outdoor clay courts. It was the 16th edition of the Copa Claro, and part of the ATP World Tour 250 series of the 2013 ATP World Tour. It took place in Buenos Aires, Argentina, from February 16 through February 24, 2013.

Singles main draw entrants

Seeds 

 Rankings are as of February 11, 2013.

Other entrants 
The following players received wildcards into the singles main draw:
  Federico Delbonis
  Diego Schwartzman
  Agustín Velotti

The following players received entry from the qualifying draw:
  Facundo Argüello
  Gastão Elias
  Dušan Lajović
  Julian Reister

The following player received entry as lucky loser:
  Marco Trungelliti

Withdrawals
Before the tournament
  Jan Hájek
  Blaž Kavčič
  Rubén Ramírez Hidalgo (right ankle injury)
  Guillaume Rufin
  Adrian Ungur

Retirements
  Facundo Argüello (abdominal injury)

Doubles main draw entrants

Seeds 

 Rankings are as of February 11, 2013.

Other entrants 
The following pairs received wildcards into the doubles main draw:
  Martín Alund /  Guido Pella
  Renzo Olivo /  Marco Trungelliti

Withdrawals
During the tournament
  Guillermo García López (low back pain)

Finals

Singles 

 David Ferrer defeated  Stanislas Wawrinka, 6–4, 3–6, 6–1

Doubles 

 Simone Bolelli /  Fabio Fognini defeated  Nicholas Monroe /  Simon Stadler, 6–3, 6–2

References

External links 
Official website

Copa Claro
ATP Buenos Aires
Copa
Copa Claro